Hara is a given name. Notable people with the name include:

 Hara Chandra Ghosh (1808–1868), leader of the Young Bengal group
 Hara P. Misra (born 1940), American biochemist
 Hara Patnaik (born 1958), Indian film actor
 Goo Hara (1991–2019), Korean singer

See also
Hara (disambiguation)

 
Indian masculine given names